Walter Pinheiro (born May 25, 1959) is a Brazilian politician. He represented Bahia in the Federal Senate from 2011 to 2016. Previously, he was a deputy from Bahia from 1997 to 2011. He is a member of the Workers' Party.

Personal life
Pinheiro is a practicing Baptist, yet despite his religion he stated that faith was a personal matter for him and he did not allow his beliefs to influence politics and vice versa.

References

Living people
1959 births
Members of the Federal Senate (Brazil)
Workers' Party (Brazil) politicians
Brazilian Baptists
Brazilian evangelicals
20th-century Protestants
21st-century Protestants
20th-century Brazilian people
21st-century Brazilian people